Wael Al-Aydy (born December 8, 1971) is an Egyptian indoor volleyball player, who played with the Egypt national team at the 2008 Summer Olympics. He plays as a libero.  He was part of the Egypt men's national volleyball team at the 2010 FIVB Volleyball Men's World Championship in Italy. He played for ZAMALEK in 2010.

Clubs
Current –  El Tayran
Debut –  AHLY

References

External links
FIVB profile

1971 births
Living people
Egyptian men's volleyball players
Sportspeople from Cairo
Volleyball players at the 2008 Summer Olympics
Olympic volleyball players of Egypt